Dark Ages or Dark Age may refer to:

History and sociology
Dark Ages (historiography), the use of the term Dark Ages by historians and lay people
Early Middle Ages (5th–10th centuries), the centuries after the fall of the Western Roman Empire
Byzantine Dark Ages (7th–8th centuries), period of large-scale transformation but obscure due to lack of sources in Byzantine history
List of myths about the Middle Ages
Bronze Age collapse (c. 1200 BC)
Greek Dark Ages (c. 1100 BC – 750 BC), a period in the history of Ancient Greece and Anatolia after the Bronze Age collapse
Irish Dark Age, a period of apparent economic and cultural stagnation in late pre-historic Ireland, lasting from c. 100 BC to c. 300 AD
Parthian Dark Age
Dark Age of Khmer / Cambodia, or the deaths of millions of Cambodians through forced labour and genocide between 1975 and 1979.
Digital dark age, a future time when it might not be possible to read historical digital documents
Societal collapse

Arts and entertainment

Film and television
 Dark Age (film), a 1987 Australian film directed by Arch Nicholson
 Dark Ages (TV series), a 1999 British sitcom
 The Dark Ages: An Age of Light, a 2012 British documentary television series
 Miracle Workers: Dark Ages, the 2020 season of Miracle Workers
 "The Dark Age" (Buffy the Vampire Slayer), a 1997 television episode
 "The Dark Age" (Bungo Stray Dogs), a 2016 television episode
 "The Dark Ages" (Roseanne), a 1992 television episode

Games
 Dark Ages (1991 video game), a platform game by Apogee Software
 Dark Ages (1999 video game), an MMORPG by KRU Interactive
 Dark Age (collectible card game), a 1996 collectible card game
 Dark Ages, a 2012 expansion for the deck-building card game Dominion

Literature
 Dark Age (novel), a 2019 novel by Pierce Brown
 The Dark Age (series), a 2002–2005 novel trilogy by Mark Chadbourn
 Dark Age of Comic Books (1986–late 1990s), a period in the American comics industry
 The Dark Age, a four-book maxiseries of the comics series Astro City

Music
 Dark Age (band), a German metal band 1995–2013

Albums
 Dark Ages (album), by Soulfly, or the title song, 2005
 The Dark Ages, an EP by Andrea Parker, 2001
 The Dark Ages, an EP Bedhead, 1996
 Little Dark Age by MGMT

Songs
 "Dark Age" (song), by the Hippos, 1988
 "Dark Ages", by Jethro Tull from Stormwatch, 1979
 "Dark Ages", by NoMeansNo from Small Parts Isolated and Destroyed, 1988
 "Dark Ages", by Scar the Martyr from Scar the Martyr, 2013
 "Dark Ages", by Yngwie Malmsteen from Trilogy, 1986

Other uses
 Dark Ages (cosmology), in Big Bang cosmology, a period ending roughly 150 million to 800 million years after the Big Bang, after which stars began to form
 "Dark Era", a hypothetical age of the universe in the far future

See also

Golden Age (disambiguation)
 Middle Ages
 Societal collapse, a situation in which a society collapses